Ethmia phricotypa is a moth in the family Depressariidae described by John David Bradley in 1965. It is found in Uganda.

References

Moths described in 1965
phricotypa